Sub.FM is an Internet radio station, primarily operating from the United Kingdom, with DJs streaming bass music, such as dubstep, grime and garage. The station was founded in 2004 by DJ and producer Whistla, and is operated as a community-run radio station.

References

External links

Internet radio stations
UK garage radio stations
Radio stations in London
Community radio stations in the United Kingdom
Electronic dance music radio stations in the United Kingdom